The given name Xaviera is a feminine form of Xavier, both derived from the 16th-century Roman Catholic Saint Francis Xavier.

People
Xaviera Hollander (b. 1943), Indonesian call girl, madam, and author
Xaviera Simmons (b. 1974), American contemporary artist
Xaviera Gold, American singer, DJ, and mixer

References

Feminine given names